Green Camel Bell was established on November 4, 2004 as the first civic environmental organization in the Gansu region in China.

It is devoted to environmental protection in western China, and it contributes to the improvement of the compromised and declining ecosystems of western China. GCB plays an active role in Gansu’s environmental protection, environmental education, and the growth of local environmental organizations.  In keeping with its constitution, purpose, and objectives, GCB has focused on the following work since its establishment:
promoting environmental protection in Gansu
adopting effective measures to resolve environmental problems in Gansu
educating elementary and secondary school students in environmental protection
promoting the development of environmental associations in Gansu’s colleges and universities
organizing training and capacity building projects for environmental volunteers

Since its establishment, Green Camel Bell has successfully conducted activities including “Fruit for Greeting Cards”, the “Gansu Flash Design Contest for Environmental Protection”, “A Green China Welcomes the Olympics – Protecting our Mother Rivers”, the “Gansu College Students’ Green Camps of 2005 and 2006", and the "Cropland Conversion to Forest and Grassland, and the College Students Forum”.

In addition, GCB has completed the first and second “Saiga Antelope Horn Market Surveys”, and has conducted a series of environmental education projects including “Environmental education in Minqin County”, the “Antelope Car Environmental education Training Project”, “Building an Environmental Education Base in Lanzhou”, and “Speaking at the Lanzhou Zoo”.

GCB has drawn up the first "Green Map" of Lanzhou and has published and distributed materials on environmental protection such as the “Green Camel Bell Newsletter” and the “Collected Works of the Gansu College Students’ Green Camp".

GCB’s current projects include the “Gansu Water Protection Project”, the “Local Environmental Teaching Materials on Desertification in Minqin, Gansu Project”, and the “Capacity Building Project for Environmental Organizations in Gansu”.

Environmental protection exchanges 
Environmental Education
Local Environmental Teaching Materials on Desertification in Minqin, Gansu
Speaking at the Lanzhou Zoo
Green Map System
Green Camel Bell Electronic Newsletter
Communication with other Groups and Individuals

Projects 
Gansu Water Environment Project
Green Journalists’ Salon
Gansu College Students’ Green Camp
Saiga Antelope Horn Market Survey

Capacity building 
Training and Practice
Promoting the Growth of Environmental Associations in Local Colleges and Universities
Advancing the Development of NGOs in Gansu

Promoting public participation in policy and the public’s right to know 
The May 29 Lanzhou Petrochemical Explosion
Preserving the Trolleybuses of Lanzhou

References

External links
 Green Camel Bell
 Green Camel Bell Newsletter
 Green Camel Bell Forum
 Global Greengrants Fund
 Pacific Environment

Environmental organizations based in China
Environmental organizations established in 2004
Organizations established in 2004
2004 establishments in China